Bruno Méndez López (born 16 April 1990 in La Roda, Asturias) is a Spanish racing driver.

Career

Master Junior Formula
After a short karting career, Méndez begun his single–seater career in the Master Junior Formula in 2006, winning six races to finish as series runner–up behind fellow Spaniard Daniel Campos-Hull.

Formula Three

In 2007, Méndez graduated to Formula Three, racing in the Spanish Formula Three Championship for the emiliodevillota.com team. He finished his maiden season seventh in the standings after taking podium places at Estoril and Jerez.

He remained in the series for a second season in 2008, this time switching to the Escuderia TEC-Auto team. After winning at the season–opener in Jarama, he took a further three podiums to be classified in fifth place.

2009 saw Méndez stay in the series, now known as the European F3 Open Championship, for a third season. Driving for Campos Racing, he won four races and took a further seven podiums to win the title by just two points after a season–long duel with countryman Celso Míguez.

2011 saw Méndez return to the category after a year's absence, racing in the British series for Hitech Racing. However, he left the team after a poor first round at Monza where he picked up just one point from the three races.

Euroseries 3000
In October 2008, Méndez made his debut in the Euroseries 3000, driving for Bull Racing at Jerez where he finished fourth and sixth in the two races. He missed the next event in Barcelona before appearing at the final round of the season in Magione with the Sighinolfi Autoracing team. A fifth-place finish in the last race of the year saw him classified in 16th place overall with eight points.

Formula Renault 3.5 Series
In October 2009, Méndez stepped up to the Formula Renault 3.5 Series, joining Esteban Guerrieri at RC Motorsport for the final round of the season at Motorland Aragón.

After taking part in FR3.5 Series winter testing with ISR Racing and Interwetten.com, Méndez signed with the newly named FHV Interwetten.com team to compete in the 2010 season, racing alongside fellow European F3 Open graduate Sergio Canamasas. During the season he took one points finish, a sixth place in a weather–affected race at Magny–Cours, to be classified 23rd in the championship. He was replaced by Salvador Durán for the final round in Barcelona after sustaining an injury during the previous weekends' Superleague Formula round in China.

Superleague Formula
In October 2010, Méndez made his debut in the Superleague Formula series, replacing the injured María de Villota at Atlético Madrid for the round at the new Ordos International Circuit. He was due to race at the following round in Beijing too, but was replaced by Dutchman Paul Meijer after he fractured his thumb during the second race of the Ordos event.

Racing record

Career summary

† – Team standings

Complete Formula Renault 3.5 Series results
(key) (Races in bold indicate pole position) (Races in italics indicate fastest lap)

References

External links

 Official website 
 Career statistics from Driver Database

1990 births
Living people
Spanish racing drivers
Euroformula Open Championship drivers
Auto GP drivers
Superleague Formula drivers
World Series Formula V8 3.5 drivers
British Formula Three Championship drivers
De Villota Motorsport drivers
Campos Racing drivers
Hitech Grand Prix drivers
RC Motorsport drivers
Alan Docking Racing drivers